Te-2 remotely controlled mine (Specialized-2 (特-2, or Te-2)) is the second generation remotely controlled naval mine that is manufactured in China.  

The project was jointly developed by the Vanguard Instrumentation Factory (前卫仪表厂), Shanghai Electric Automation Research Institute, Shanghai Jiaotong University, and 

The mine has three states:  safety, armed, and detonation.  The bottom mine can remain in any one of these three states, though most of time it remains in the safety state.  Upon receiving the remote commands, the mine can be switched to any one of the three states.  The minefield consisted of Specialized-2 bottom mines can thus be inactive when friendly force passes by while the activated when enemy is in the area.  Currently, all Specialized-2 mines are upgraded to the Specialized-2-1 standard.

Naval mines of the People's Republic of China